Glas Slavonije is a Croatian daily newspaper published in Osijek. In 2000, its average daily circulation was c. 9000, making it the 7th largest daily newspaper in Croatia.

History 

It is considered that Glas Slavonije is successor of Hrvatski list, a newspaper from Osijek published from 1920 to 1945.

The first issue of Glas Slavonije was published in 1943.

References

External links

ICON: International Newspaper Database - Glas Slavonije search results

Daily newspapers published in Croatia
Croatian-language newspapers
Mass media in Osijek
Newspapers established in 1943
Newspapers published in Yugoslavia